Éditions Galilée is a French publishing house located in Paris, and was founded in 1971 by Michel Delorme. It specializes in philosophy, French literature, arts and human sciences. Focusing on the deconstructionist thought of Jacques Derrida, Galilée also publishes works on postmodernist thought (Jean Baudrillard, Jean-François Lyotard, etc.).

In 2008, their catalogue consisted of around 900 titles and was run by Michel Delorme (CEO, editorial director).

History 

Éditions Galilée was Founded in 1971. In 1973, Éditions Galilée published the 1973 Critique du capitalisme quotidien by Michel Bosquet; Les Figures juives de Marx by Elisabeth de Fontenay; Le Discours impur by Jean-Noël Vuarnet; Camera obscura : de l'idéologie by Sarah Kofman; Le Titre de la lettre by Philippe Lacoue-Labarthe; and Jean-Luc Nancy; L'Archéologie du frivole by Jacques Derrida in the preface to L'Essai sur l'origine des connaissances humaines by Condillac; and La Remarque spéculative by Jean-Luc Nancy.

Less than a year later, Derrida, Nancy, Lacoue-Labarthe and Kofman created the collection "La philosophie en effet" which Derrida inaugurated with the publication of Glas. It was in the same collection that Sarah Kofman published Quatre romans analytiques shortly after. In 1974, Georges Perec published Espèces d'espaces, and Alphabets in 1976.
In 1974 and 1975, éditions Galilée published the first five issues of the review Digraphe, edited by Jean Ristat, as well as multiple issues of the review Chorus edited by Pierre Tilman.

The mixture of artists, works, and work with books and their creators, which was the founding ethos of Galilée, led to further publications from Marcel Duchamp and the fictional Jean Clair, L'Invention du corps chrétien by Jean-Louis Schefer, and Wifredo Lam publishing Dessins (1975). Further, Détruire la peinture by Louis Marin, Les Transformateurs Duchamp by Jean-François Lyotard (1977). Oublier Foucault by Jean Baudrillard, Fondements pour une morale by André Gorz, L'Éboulement by Jacques Dupin, Vitesse et politique by Paul Virilio were also published in 1977. In 1979, Christian Boltanski created for Farce by Jean-Marie Touratier, an original cover and created a separate original cover with an opening window showing a sugar cage created by Boltanski in 1971. Pierre Restany published L'Autre Face de l'art the same year. In 1980, Jean Baudrillard published De la séduction, Paul Virilio : Vitesse et politique, Jean Oury : Onze heures du soir à la Borde, Jean-Clarence Lambert : Le Noir de l'azur, followd in 1984, Jean-Joseph Goux, Les monnayeurs du langage, Christine Buci-Glucksmann : La Raison baroque and in 1986, Michel Ragon : 25 ans d'art vivant ; finally, to close the decade, Michel Sicard published his Essais sur Sartre  and Félix Guattari released his Cartographies schizoanalytiques in 1989.

In the following years, Bernard Stiegler released his first title for Galilée with La Technique et le Temps I in 1994, Philippe Bonnefis (first title at Galilée : Parfums, in 1995), Ignacio Ramonet (Géopolitique du chaos, 1997), Hélène Cixous (Voiles, with Jacques Derrida, 1998), Michel Deguy (La Raison poétique, 2000), Serge Margel (Logique de la nature, 2000), Michel Onfray (Célébration du génie colérique, 2002), Marc Crépon (Terreur et poésie, 2004), Pascal Quignard (Écrits de l'éphémère, 2005, along with five other books the same year),  (Le spectre juif de Hegel, 2005), Stéphane Sangral (Méandres et Néant, 2013), and many others. Other artists continued to publish with the company: Valerio Adami, Pierre Alechinsky, Karel Appel, Christian Boltanski, Pol Bury, Corneille Guillaume Beverloo, Leonardo Cremonini, Henri Cueco, Dado, Erro, Gérard Garouste, Peter Klasen, Jean Le Gac, Simon Hantaï, Paul Jenkins, François Martin, Raymond Mason, Jacques Monory, Danièle Noël, Ernest Pignon-Ernest, François Rouan, Antonio Segui, Takis, Antoni Tàpies, Vladimir Veličković.

Main collections 

 « Débats »
 « L'espace critique » 
 « Incises » 
 « Écritures / Figures » 
 « La philosophie en effet » 
 « Lignes fictives »

Main authors 
 Marc Augé
 Jean Baudrillard
 Yves Bonnefoy
 Christine Buci-Glucksmann
 Hélène Cixous
 
 Michel Deguy
 Jacques Derrida
 Serge Doubrovsky
 Félix Guattari
 André Gorz
 Jean-Joseph Goux
 Sarah Kofman
 Philippe Lacoue-Labarthe
 Jean Le Gac
 Jean-François Lyotard
 Serge Margel
 Jean-Luc Nancy
 Michel Onfray
 Pascal Quignard
 Ignacio Ramonet
 Jacques Rancière
 Stéphane Sangral
 Jean-Louis Schefer
 Bernard Stiegler
 Paul Virilio

Notes and references

External links 
 editions-galilee.fr, Official site

Book publishing companies of France
Publishing companies established in 1971